Ahmed Akkari (born 1978 in Lebanon) is a Danish political activist who became known for his involvement

in the Jyllands-Posten Muhammad cartoons controversy. Widely called an "Imam" in the media, he himself denied being one. He was a co-author of the Akkari-Laban dossier, which played a major role in the Jyllands-Posten Muhammad cartoons controversy by bringing the issue to the attention of influential decision-makers in the Middle East. In 2013 he distanced himself from his former position and in June 2020 became one of the founders of the political party New Centre-Left.

Early years

Ahmed Akkari was born in Lebanon in 1978. In 1985 the Akkaris family came to Denmark, where they obtained asylum, but returned to Lebanon in 1990. Upon their return to Denmark a year later they found they did not qualify as refugees again, because the Lebanese Civil War was over. With the support of some Danish local media, which featured young Ahmed as a model immigrant, they were granted a humanitarian residency permit in 1994. Ahmed Akkari subsequently went to high school and trained as a teacher in Århus. He became a Danish citizen in 2005  which made him eligible to be evacuated from Lebanon again in 2006.

Legal matters 
In 2001 Ahmed Akkari was sentenced to 40 days in prison for beating an 11-year-old schoolboy on 3 November 2000 because the boy had allegedly been bullying Akkari's little sister. The sentence was suspended because Akkari was a first-time offender. Akkari, who was studying to be a teacher at the time, was present that day at Muslim private school Lykkeskolen in Aarhus where he was working as an apprentice teacher. According to sources at the school quoted in Ekstra-Bladet, his 11-year-old sister was playing with a boy from her class and the boy accidentally pulled her headscarf off. Akkari sought out the boy, pulled his ear drawing blood, and threw him to the ground kicking him several times.

Cartoons controversy
During the Jyllands-Posten Muhammad cartoons controversy Akkari acted as a spokesman of the Danish-based European Committee for Prophet Honouring
and spokesman of the Islamisk Trossamfund (Islamic Society in Denmark).

Controversial statements
In a documentary published by French television channel France 2 on 23 March 2006, Akkari was recorded - using a hidden camera - in conversation with Sheikh Raed Hlayhel (who was the head of the delegation to disseminate the "Akkari-Laban dossier"). Akkari made a statement which can be interpreted as an implicit death threat against Naser Khader, who is a moderate Muslim and, at the time, a member of the Danish parliament for the Social Liberal Party. According to the footage Akkari said: "...If Khader becomes minister of integration, shouldn't someone dispatch two guys to blow up him and his ministry?...".

The comment was disputed. In the Arabic-French translation, Akkari calls for an attack on the ministry, but in two Arabic-Danish translations, Akkari merely states the possibility of such an attack. TV2's Arabic-Danish translation says "...If he (Khader) becomes minister of integration, isn't it possible that a couple (of people) would come to blow up him and his ministry?...".

A fellow party member from Khader's party Elsebeth Gerner Nielsen reported Ahmed Akkari to the police. Ahmed Akkari initially denied the statements, but later apologized and stated it was meant as a joke. The following day, 24 March 2006, Islamisk Trossamfund announced that Ahmed Akkari was no longer spokesman for the organization; Akkari denied this.

Apology
In July 2013 Akkari distanced himself from the actions he took as an Imam in promoting fundamentalism. He stated that he had come to see the value of free speech, and apologized for his behavior during the Muhammad crisis. He also met with the cartoonist Kurt Westergaard and apologized in person.

References

1978 births
Living people
People associated with the Jyllands-Posten Muhammad cartoons controversy
Lebanese emigrants to Denmark
Former Muslim critics of Islam
Danish critics of Islam
Former Muslims turned agnostics or atheists